Nicolas Saint Grégoire is a French artist and designer born in 1983. Dividing his time between Paris and New York, he is represented by Galerie Marcel Strouk Rive Gauche (Paris), Cynthia Corbett Gallery (London) and Life As a Work of Art (New York).

Nicolas Saint Gregoire is working mainly with Plexiglas and neon.
Seeking to break the boundaries between Fine Arts and other artistic practices such as design or fashion, the work of Nicolas Saint Gregoire raises the question of the nature of a piece of art.

He takes over from traditional forms of furniture (tables, chairs, lighting...) and frees them from all functional, economics or social role. Through his work, those utilitarian objects become objects of art.

Starting 2009, he started drawing the repertoire of forms and motifs created by fashion designer Yves Saint Laurent to create light sculptures that interrogates the status of fashion as art.

Exhibitions
2013: Frimousses de Createurs - UNICEF - Petit Palais - Paris
2013: Art Southampton - Curator special project - USA 
2013: Diva special project - Monaco
2012: Frimousses de Createurs - UNICEF - Petit Palais - Paris
2012: Saint Gregoire Rive Gauche, Stéphane Olivier Gallery, Paris
2011: ArtCouture. Solo Show. Gallery 27, London
2011: Nicolas Saint Gregoire, Stéphane Olivier Gallery, Paris
2011: Volta Basel, Basel
2011: Art San Francisco 
2010: ArtDesign. Solo Show, Stranos, Saint-Tropez
2010: London Art Fair
2010: Art Miami
2009: Art Miami (selected to represent contemporary sculpture)
2009: Art on the Top. Solo Show. Empire State Building, New York

References

External links
Official website
Life As a Work of Art Gallery website
Galerie Marcel Strouk Rive Gauche
The Cynthia Corbett Gallery website

French designers
1983 births
Living people